Crystal Mall is a shopping mall located in Rajkot in Gujarat State of India. It is located on western part of Rajkot City on main Kalawad Road. Gandhi Realty owns and manages the Crystal Mall. The mall opened its doors to the public on 28 September 2009.

The complex includes many brands.  It has a cinema and a food court.

Design
The mall is nearly square building, with a roughly C-shape floor plans. Over 52 stores are arranged along five levels of pedestrian walkways on the sides of the rectangle with 3 Screen Multiplex Cinema on second floor & third floor. Four anchor stores are located at the corners.

The mall is organized into four different zones, each with its own decorative style. Two nearly identical floors of the mall provide 400 car parking spaces.

References

External links

Crystal Mall Rajkot Official Site
Crystal Mall Rajkot Developer's Official Site

Buildings and structures in Rajkot
Shopping malls in Gujarat
Shopping malls established in 2009
2009 establishments in Gujarat